Auto Focus is a 2002 American biographical drama film directed by Paul Schrader and starring Greg Kinnear and Willem Dafoe. The screenplay by Michael Gerbosi is based on Robert Graysmith's book The Murder of Bob Crane (1993).

Auto Focus tells a dramatized story of the actor Bob Crane, an affable radio show host and amateur drummer who found success on Hogan's Heroes, a popular television sitcom, and his dramatic descent into the underbelly of Hollywood after the series was cancelled and he formed a friendship with John Henry Carpenter.

Carpenter was later tried, and acquitted in 1994 of Crane's murder. Although the crime remains officially unsolved, Carpenter has remained the main subject of suspicion even after his death in 1998.

Synopsis
Disc-jockey-turned-actor Bob Crane develops a secret personal life, focusing on his relationship with John Henry Carpenter, an electronics expert involved with the nascent home video market. Encouraged by Carpenter and enabled by his expertise, Crane—a church-going, clean-cut family man—becomes a sex addict obsessed with women and with recording his encounters using video and photographic equipment, usually with Carpenter participating.

As the years pass, the relationship between Crane and Carpenter unravels in a dangerous way. Crane is divorced by his wife Anne before marrying Patricia Olson, a former co-star from his hit television series Hogan's Heroes. After the show goes off the air, Crane struggles to find work while dealing with money troubles. By the time Walt Disney Productions hires him for the leading role in a family movie, Superdad, his reputation for being obsessed with sex and pornography starts to jeopardize his image.

Confined to doing dinner theater in mid-sized cities, Crane's attempts to distance himself from Carpenter fail as their sexual escapades continue. Carpenter soon becomes "my only friend", but after a final falling-out between them in Scottsdale, Arizona, someone bludgeons Crane to death inside a motel room. Carpenter is tried for the murder, but many years later, he is acquitted in 1994. To this day, Crane's murder remains unsolved.

Cast

Production notes
The film premiered at the Toronto International Film Festival and was shown at the San Sebastián Film Festival, the Helsinki International Film Festival, the Chicago International Film Festival, the New Orleans Film Festival, and the Bergen International Film Festival before going into limited release on eleven screens in the US, earning $123,761 on its opening weekend. It grossed $2,063,196 in the US and $641,755 in foreign markets for a total worldwide box office of $2,704,951.

The DVD release includes a 50-minute documentary, Murder in Scottsdale, which delves into the initial murder investigation and the reopening of the case some 15 years later. The DVD also features several audio commentary tracks.

Critical reception
The film met with a largely positive reception from critics. A. O. Scott of The New York Times said the film "gets to you like a low-grade fever, a malaise with no known antidote. When it was over, I wasn't sure if I needed a drink, a shower or a lifelong vow of chastity ... there is [a] severe, powerful moralism lurking beneath the film's dispassionate matter-of-factness. Mr. Schrader is indifferent to the sinner, but he cannot contain his loathing of the sin, which is not so much sex as the fascination with images ... To argue that images can corrupt the flesh and hollow out the soul is, for a filmmaker, an obviously contradictory exercise, but not necessarily a hypocritical one. There is plenty of nudity in Auto Focus, but you can always glimpse the abyss behind the undulating bodies, and the director leads you from easy titillation to suffocating dread, pausing only briefly and cautiously to consider the possibility of pleasure."

Roger Ebert of the Chicago Sun-Times gave the film four stars, calling it "a hypnotic portrait ... pitch-perfect in its decor, music, clothes, cars, language and values ... Greg Kinnear gives a creepy, brilliant performance as a man lacking in all insight ... Crane was not a complex man, but that should not blind us to the subtlety and complexity of Kinnear's performance."

Edward Guthmann of the San Francisco Chronicle called it "a compelling, sympathetic portrait ... Kinnear undercuts the seaminess of the Crane story, and shows us a man with more dimension and complexity than his behavior might suggest."

Peter Travers of Rolling Stone awarded it 3½ out of 4 stars and added, "Schrader, the writer of Taxi Driver and the director of American Gigolo, is a poet of male sexual pathology. Shot through with profane laughs and stinging drama, Auto Focus ranks with his best films."

Todd McCarthy of Variety called it "one of director Paul Schrader's best films, and like Boogie Nights ranks as a shrewd exposé of recent Hollywood's slimy underside ... Schrader directs with a very smooth hand, providing a good-natured and frequently amusing spin to eventually grim material that aptly reflects the protagonist's almost unfailing good humor ... Pic overall has an excellent period in Los Angeles feel without getting elaborate about it, and musical contributions by Angelo Badalamenti and a host of pop tunes are tops."

On review aggregator website Rotten Tomatoes, the film holds an approval rating of 71% based on 163 reviews, and an average rating of 6.64/10. The website's critical consensus states, "Kinnear and Dafoe help make this downward spiral of one man's life a compelling watch." On Metacritic, the film has a weighted average score of 66 out of 100, based on 36 critics, indicating "generally favorable reviews".

Criticism by Scotty Crane
One of Bob Crane's sons, Scotty, bitterly attacked the film as being inaccurate. In an October 2002 article, Scotty said that his father was not a regular church-goer and had only been to church three times in the last dozen years of his life, including his own funeral. There is no evidence that Crane engaged in S&M, and director Paul Schrader told Scotty that the S&M scene was based on Schrader's own personal experience. Scotty claims that his father and John Carpenter did not become close friends who socialized together until 1975, and that Crane was already a sex addict and had recorded his sexual encounters since 1956, long before he became famous.

Scotty and his mother had written their own script for a film biography on Crane. The spec script, alternately titled "F-Stop" and "Take Off Your Clothes and Smile", was written up in Variety by columnist Army Archerd, but after Auto-Focus was announced, interest in Scotty's script ceased.

Awards and nominations
Paul Schrader was nominated for the Golden Seashell at the San Sebastián International Film Festival. Willem Dafoe was nominated for Best Supporting Actor by the Chicago Film Critics Association but lost to Tim Robbins for Mystic River.

References

External links
 
 
 

2002 films
2002 biographical drama films
American biographical drama films
American independent films
Biographical films about actors
2000s English-language films
American films based on actual events
Films directed by Paul Schrader
Films set in the 1960s
Films set in the 1970s
Films set in Scottsdale, Arizona
Films set in California
Films shot in California
Films shot in New York (state)
Sony Pictures Classics films
Films about pornography
Films about sex addiction
Films scored by Angelo Badalamenti
Films produced by Brian Oliver
2002 drama films
2002 independent films
2000s American films